Anethole (also known as anise camphor) is an organic compound that is widely used as a flavoring substance. It is a derivative of phenylpropene, a type of aromatic compound that occurs widely in nature, in essential oils. It is in the class of phenylpropanoid organic compounds. It contributes a large component of the odor and flavor of anise and fennel (both in the botanical family Apiaceae), anise myrtle (Myrtaceae), liquorice (Fabaceae), magnolia blossoms, and star anise (Schisandraceae). Closely related to anethole is its isomer estragole, abundant in tarragon (Asteraceae) and basil (Lamiaceae), that has a flavor reminiscent of anise. It is a colorless, fragrant, mildly volatile liquid. Anethole is only slightly soluble in water but exhibits high solubility in ethanol. This trait causes certain anise-flavored liqueurs to become opaque when diluted with water; the ouzo effect.

Structure and production 
Anethole is an aromatic, unsaturated ether related to lignols. It exists as both cis–trans isomers (see also E–Z notation), involving the double bond outside the ring. The more abundant isomer, and the one preferred for use, is the trans or E isomer.

Like related compounds, anethole is poorly soluble in water. Historically, this property was used to detect adulteration in samples.

Most anethole is obtained from turpentine-like extracts from trees. Of only minor commercial significance, anethole can also be isolated from essential oils.

Currently Banwari Chemicals Pvt Ltd situated in Bhiwadi, Rajasthan, India is the leading manufacuterer of Anethole. It is prepared commercially from 4-methoxypropiophenone, which is prepared from anisole.

Uses

Flavoring 
Anethole is distinctly sweet, measuring 13 times sweeter than sugar. It is perceived as being pleasant to the taste even at higher concentrations. It is used in alcoholic drinks ouzo, rakı, anisette and absinthe, among others. It is also used in seasoning and confectionery applications, oral hygiene products, and in small quantities in natural berry flavors.

Precursor to other compounds 
Because they metabolize anethole into several aromatic chemical compounds, some bacteria are candidates for use in commercial bioconversion of anethole to more valuable materials. Bacterial strains capable of using trans-anethole as the sole carbon source include JYR-1 (Pseudomonas putida) and TA13 (Arthrobacter aurescens).

Research

Antimicrobial and antifungal activity 
Anethole has potent antimicrobial properties, against bacteria, yeasts, and fungi. Reported antibacterial properties include both bacteriostatic and bactericidal action against Salmonella enterica but not when used against Salmonella via a fumigation method. Antifungal activity includes increasing the effectiveness of some other phytochemicals (such as polygodial) against Saccharomyces cerevisiae and Candida albicans;

In vitro, anethole has antihelmintic action on eggs and larvae of the sheep gastrointestinal nematode Haemonchus contortus. Anethole also has nematicidal activity against the plant nematode Meloidogyne javanica in vitro and in pots of cucumber seedlings.

Insecticidal activity 
Anethole also is a promising insecticide. Several essential oils consisting mostly of anethole have insecticidal action against larvae of the mosquito Ochlerotatus caspius and Aedes aegypti. In a similar manner, anethole itself is effective against the fungus gnat Lycoriella ingenua (Sciaridae) and the mold mite Tyrophagus putrescentiae. Against the mite, anethole is a slightly more effective pesticide than DEET, but anisaldehyde, a related natural compound that occurs with anethole in many essential oils, is 14 times more effective. The insecticidal action of anethole is greater as a fumigant than as a contact agent. trans-Anethole is highly effective as a fumigant against the cockroach Blattella germanica and against adults of the weevils Sitophilus oryzae, Callosobruchus chinensis and beetle Lasioderma serricorne.

As well as an insect pesticide, anethole is an effective insect repellent against mosquitos.

Ouzo effect 

Anethole is responsible for the "ouzo effect" (also "louche effect"), the spontaneous formation of a microemulsion that gives many alcoholic beverages containing anethole and water their cloudy appearance. Such a spontaneous microemulsion has many potential commercial applications in the food and pharmaceutical industries.

Precursor to illicit drugs 
Anethole is an inexpensive chemical precursor for paramethoxyamphetamine (PMA), and is used in its clandestine manufacture. Anethole is present in the essential oil from guarana, which has psychoactive effects typically attributed to its caffeine content. The absence of PMA or any other known psychoactive derivative of anethole in human urine after ingestion of guarana leads to the conclusion that any psychoactive effect of guarana is not due to aminated anethole metabolites.

Anethole is also present in absinthe, a liquor with a reputation for psychoactive effects; these effects, however, are attributed to ethanol. (See also thujone, anethole dithione (ADT), and anethole trithione (ATT).)

Estrogen and prolactin 
Anethole has estrogenic activity. It has been found to significantly increase uterine weight in immature female rats.

Fennel, which contains anethole, has been found to have a galactagogue effect in animals. Anethole bears a structural resemblance to catecholamines like dopamine and may displace dopamine from its receptors and thereby disinhibit prolactin secretion, which in turn may be responsible for the galactagogue effects.

Safety 
In the USA, anethole is generally recognized as safe (GRAS). After a hiatus due to safety concerns, anethole was reaffirmed by Flavor and Extract Manufacturers Association (FEMA) as GRAS. The concerns related to liver toxicity and possible carcinogenic activity reported in rats. Anethole is associated with a slight increase in liver cancer in rats, although the evidence is scant and generally regarded as evidence that anethole is not a carcinogen. An evaluation of anethole by the Joint FAO/WHO Expert Committee on Food Additives (JECFA) found its notable pharmacologic properties to be reduction in motor activity, lowering of body temperature, and hypnotic, analgesic, and anticonvulsant effects. A subsequent evaluation by JECFA found some reason for concern regarding carcinogenicity, but there is currently insufficient data to support this. At this time, the JECFA summary of these evaluations is that anethole has "no safety concern at current levels of intake when used as a flavoring agent".

In large quantities, anethole is slightly toxic and may act as an irritant.

History 
That an oil could be extracted from anise and fennel had been known since the Renaissance by the German alchemist Hieronymus Brunschwig, the German botanist Adam Lonicer (1528–1586), and the German physician Valerius Cordus (1515–1544), among others. Anethole was first investigated chemically by the Swiss chemist Nicolas-Théodore de Saussure in 1820. In 1832 the French chemist Jean Baptiste Dumas determined that the crystallizable components of anise oil and fennel oil were identical, and he determined anethole's empirical formula. In 1845, the French chemist Charles Gerhardt coined the term anethol – from the Latin anethum (anise) + oleum (oil) – for the fundamental compound from which a family of related compounds was derived. Although the German chemist Emil Erlenmeyer proposed the correct molecular structure for anethole in 1866, it was not until 1872 that the structure was accepted as correct.

See also 
 :Category:Anise liqueurs and spirits
 List of liqueurs § Anise-flavored liqueurs
 Anol
 Chavicol
 Dianethole
 Fenchone
 Pseudoisoeugenol
 Safrole

References

External links

Flavors
Sugar substitutes
Essential oils
Phenylpropenes
O-methylated natural phenols
Estrogens